Jason Saab (born 8 October 2000) is an Australian professional rugby league footballer who plays as a er for the Manly-Warringah Sea Eagles in the NRL.

He previously played for the St. George Illawarra Dragons in the National Rugby League.

Background
Saab was born in Newtown, New South Wales, and is of Nigerian and Indigenous Australian descent. Saab's step-father is Lebanese, hence his surname. 

Saab played his junior rugby league for the Merrylands Rams and for Parramatta City Titans. 

Saab attended Westfields Sports High School. and graduated in 2018.
 
In 2018, Saab was picked for the Australian Schoolboys rugby league team and represented Australia in London, United Kingdom

Career

2019
Saab made his first grade debut in Round 19 of the 2019 NRL season for the St. George Illawarra Dragons against South Sydney, starting on the wing and scoring two tries in their 20–16 loss in the last minute due to Campbell Graham try at ANZ Stadium.

2020
In August 2020, Sporting News reported that Saab had sought an early release from his contract due to the traveling distance between Wollongong and his home in Western Sydney. However, St. George Illawarra refused this request unless the club would be compensated either by cash or player transfer. In September, there was speculation that Saab would be joining the Manly-Warringah Sea Eagles as a trade for St. George junior Reuben Garrick.

Saab made only four appearances for St. George in the 2020 NRL season as the club finished 13th on the table.

On 26 November 2020, Saab was granted a release from his contract with St. George and shortly thereafter signed a three-year deal with Manly-Warringah.

2021
In round 1 of the 2021 NRL season, Saab made his debut for Manly-Warringah in the club's 46-4 loss against the Sydney Roosters.
In round 6 of the 2021 NRL season, he scored two tries in Manly's 36-0 victory over the Gold Coast.

In round 9 of the 2021 NRL season, Saab scored a hat-trick in Manly's 38-32 victory over New Zealand Warriors.

In round 10 of the 2021 NRL season, Saab scored another two tries for Manly-Warringah in a 50-6 victory over Brisbane at Suncorp Stadium.

In round 15, Saab scored two tries for Manly in a 56-24 victory over the Gold Coast.
The following week, he scored a hat-trick in Manly's 66-0 victory over Canterbury.

In round 20, Saab scored two tries for Manly in their 40-22 victory over rivals Cronulla in the battle of the beaches match.

At the end of year club awards night, Jason Saab and Josh Schuster were announced as joint winners of the Ken Arthurson Rising Star Award for 2021 after their strong seasons for Manly.

2022
In round 18 of the 2022 NRL season, Saab scored two tries in a 42-12 victory over Newcastle. 
Saab was one of seven players involved in the Manly pride jersey player boycott.
Saab made 16 appearances for Manly in the 2022 NRL season scoring seven tries.  Manly would finish the season in 11th place on the table.

References

External links
Manly Sea Eagles profile
Dragons profile

2000 births
Living people
Australian people of Nigerian descent
Indigenous Australian rugby league players
Australian rugby league players
St. George Illawarra Dragons players
Manly Warringah Sea Eagles players
Rugby league players from Sydney
Rugby league wingers
People educated at Westfields Sports High School